The 2016–17 NCAA Division III men's ice hockey season began on October 28, 2016, and concluded on March 25, 2017. This was the 44th season of Division III college ice hockey.

The Commonwealth Coast Conference, the primary league for six of the nine members of ECAC Northeast and one member of the NEHC, began sponsoring men's ice hockey this season. Because seven teams is the minimum requirement for a league to qualify for an automatic bid the new conference would be able to retain the qualifier formerly possessed by ECAC Northeast. The three remaining ECAC Northeast teams (Becker, Johnson & Wales and Suffolk) joined CCC as affiliate members for at least men's ice hockey.

The NCAA also increased the number of participants in the National Tournament to twelve.

Regular season

Season tournaments

Standings

Note: Mini-game are not included in final standings

2017 NCAA Tournament

See also
 2016–17 NCAA Division I men's ice hockey season
 2016–17 NCAA Division II men's ice hockey season

References

External links

 
NCAA